Diriangén FC is a Nicaraguan professional football club based in Diriamba which competes in Nicaraguan Premier Division (Primera Division). It is one of the oldest clubs in not only Nicaragua but also in Central America.

History
Founded in 1917, Diriangén has won a total of 29 domestic titles, including at least one in every decade since the 1940s.  They are also the only club in Nicaragua to have competed in every season of the league's top flight.  As a result of this success, the club has become associated with the motto "Diriangén no tuvo infancia, porque nació grande" ("Diriangen never had a childhood because it was born big")'.

Diriangén's strongest era was in the 1940s, when they won six consecutive championships (1940–45).  They won a seventh championship in 1949, and hoisted the crown three times in the 1950s (1953, 1956, and 1959).  A long drought followed in the 1960s, but the club rebounded with consecutive titles in 1969–70 and again in 1974.

The 1980s saw a return to the form of glory days past.  It opened with a threepeat (1981, 1982, and 1983) and included other championships in 1987 and 1989.  The 1990s were similar—a threepeat from 1994–97, followed by a title win in 1999–2000.  However, the 2000s didn't go quite as well.  Although Diriangén managed to win the championship in 2004–2005 and 2005–2006, the real power in Nicaragua had shifted to Real Esteli, winners of thirteen championships in 16 years.

Meanwhile, Diriangén struggled through a thirteen year title drought.  That year was finally broken in Clausura 2018, when they knocked off Real Esteli 3–1 on aggregate.

The club celebrated its 100-year celebration in 2017

Current squad
As of: August 2022

Personnel

Current technical staff

Management

Honours and International Appearances

National
 Primera División de Nicaragua and predecessors
 Champions (30) : 1940, 1941, 1942, 1943, 1944, 1945, 1949, 1953, 1956, 1959, 1969, 1970, 1974, 1981, 1982, 1983, 1987, 1989, 1992, 1995, 1996, 1997, 2000, 2005, 2006, Clausura 2018, 2021 Clausura, 2021 Apertura, Clausura 2022
 Copa de Nicaragua and predecessors
 Champions (3) : 1996, 1997, 2020

International
CONCACAF Cup Winners Cup: 2 appearances
1994 – Quarter-Finals
1997 – Qualifying Stage (Central Zone)

Record versus other Clubs
 As of 2013-09-13
The Concacaf opponents below = Official tournament results:
(Plus a sampling of other results)

Sponsors

Jersey sponsors
claro (2001–06)
Movistar (2007–2015)
claro (2015–present)
totto (2014–present)
U de M (2014–present)
Alcaldía de Diriamba (2014–present)
 CrediFacil
 Proplasa
 betcris
 Victoria Frost
 Iresa
 Flor de Cana

Shirt sponsors
Joma (2003–2022)
Macron (2022-present; also the shirt manufacturers)

Stadium

The stadium, Estadio Cacique Diriangén, holds 7,500 people. It is a multi-purpose stadium, and has been the home stadium of the Nicaragua national football team for many years. The stadium has much history: In this stadium the club Diriangén FC won against many teams from Central America.

List of managers
Diriangen has had permanent managers since it first appointed Napolen Parrales Bendaña as coach in 1917. The longest-serving manager was Mauricio Cruz Jiron, who managed Diriangen for fourteen years from 1992 to 2006. Hungarian Eduardo Kosovic was the foreign coach in the club. Mauricio Cruz Jiron is the most successful manager as he led the club to seven primera division titles.

  Napolen Parrales Bendaña (1917–TBD)
  Miguel  Cuadra Gonzalez
  Alberto Davila El Tico 
  Carlos Marin (1940s)
  Eduardo Kosovic (1940s)
  Lurio Martinez (1950s)
  Eduardo Cosovich (1956)
  Luis Angel Pipila Umana (1958)
  Santiago Bonilla (1950s)
  Santiago Berrini (1960s)
  Omar Muraco
  Martin "El Cantante" García
  Manuel "Catarro" Cuadra (1960s)
  Armando Ruiz (1960s)
  Omar Jiron Rugamas (1960s)
  Roberto Guardia (1960s)
  Livio Bendaña Espinoza (1966–72)
  Oscar Figueroa Cristales Cocoroco"' (1973)
  Pedro Jose Jiron (1970s)
  Julio Rocha Ideaquez El negro Julio (1970s)
  Armando Mendieta Parrales Miluy (1980s)
  Jose Manuel Figuero Chemanel (1980s)
  William Parrales Quintanilla (1980s)
  Benjamin Parrales (1980s)
  Mario Chavez Morales (1980s)
  Milton Cuadra Serrano (1990-1991)
  Mauricio Cruz Jiron (1991– 2006)
  Róger "Pinocho" Rodríguez (Aug 2006–06)
  Martín Mena (2007)
  Mauricio Cruz Jiron (2008–10)
  Edgardo Soza (2010)
  Rolando Méndez (2010–11)
  Glen Blanco (July 2011 – Oct 11)
  Martín Mena (Oct 2011 – Feb 12)
  Ángel Eugenio Orellana (Feb 2012 – June 12)
  Francisco Nuñez (June 2012 – Sept 12)
  Luis Vega (Sep 2012 – Oct 12)
  Carlos Alberto de Toro (Oct 2012 – Nov 13)
  Flavio Da Silva (Nov 2013 – May 14)
  Florencio Leiva (June 2014 – Aug 14)
  Roberto Chanampe (Aug 2014 – July 2015)
  Andrés Novara (July 2015 – Oct 2015)
  Javier Londoño (Oct 2015 – Jan 2016)
  Mario Reig (Jan 2016 – Feb 2016)
  Jose Luis Rugamas (Feb 2016 – Aug 2016)
  Tyron Acevedo (Aug 2016 – May 2017)
  Mauricio Cruz Jiron (May 2017– Sep 2019)
  Flavio Da Silva (Sep 2019-April 2022)
  Tyrone Leiva (April 2022 - Present'')

Notable managers
The following managers have won at least one trophy while in charge at Diriangen:

Women's team
The women's team has won the Nicaraguan women's football championship four times in 2000, 2001, 2003 and lately in 2010.

References

External links
 Soccerway profile
 Los inmortales caciques (history) – La Prensa 
 Historias del Fútbol Diriambino: Nacimiento del Diriangen Papyfutbol – Futbol de Nicaragua 
 De la gloria a la inmortalidad – La Prensa 
 El Equipo Diriangen de Futbol – Multicampeon Nica – Diriamba 
 Livio Bendaña Espinoza – El Nuevo Diario 
 Luis Mario "El Mesie" Orellana Castro – Notifutbol 
 Diriangen FC: 92 Años de Orgullo y Pasión – Notifutbol 
 Defendamos 83 años de historia – El Nuevo Diario 
 Trece técnicos han pasado durante la sequía – Barra Cacique 

 
Football clubs in Nicaragua
Association football clubs established in 1917
1917 establishments in Nicaragua
Unrelegated association football clubs